Calotes ceylonensis, commonly known as the painted-lipped lizard or the Ceylon bloodsucker, is a species of lizard in the family Agamidae. It is one of four Calotes species endemic to Sri Lanka.

Habitat
C. ceylonensis is confined to monsoon forests, plantations, and home gardens in the dry and intermediate zones of Sri Lanka.

Geographic range

Description

C. ceylonensis is a colorful, arboreal agamid. The length of the head is one and half times the width. The body is laterally compressed. The tail is long and slender, about or over twice the head-body length. The cheeks are swollen. Two separated spines can be seen above the tympanum. The nuchal crest is formed with low spines. Midbody scale rows number 54–60.

The dorsum is brown, with indistinct brown crossbands. The head and anterior part of body are blackish-brown. There is a bright red or reddish-orange stripe on the upper lip that extends to the back of the head. When the lizard is threatened, or agitated by stress, the brown-colored lip turns to a bright white color, as does the dorso-nuchal crest. The throat of adult males is black. The tail is brown with dark crossbands. The venter is pale brown with darker crossbands.

Behavior
C. ceylonensis is active during the day on tree trunks.

Diet
The diet of C. ceylonensis comprises insects and other arthropods.

Reproduction

References

Further reading
Boulenger GA. 1890. The Fauna of British India, Including Ceylon and Burma. Reptilia and Batrachia. London: Secretary of State for India in Council. (Taylor and Francis, printers). xviii + 541 pp. (Calotes ceylonensis, pp. 139–140).
Müller F. 1887. "Fünfter Nachtrag zum Katalog der herpetologischen Sammlung des Basler Museums ". Verhandlung der Naturforschenden Gesellschaft in Basel 8: 249–296. ("Calotes mystaceus var. ceylonensis " = Calotes ceylonensis, new species, pp. 292–293). (in German).
Smith MA. 1935. The Fauna of British India, Including Ceylon and Burma. Reptilia and Amphibia. Vol. II.—Sauria. London: Secretary of State for India in Council. (Taylor and Francis, printers). xiii + 440 pp. + Plate I + 2 maps. (Calotes ceylonensis, pp. 202–203).

Calotes
Lizards of Asia
Reptiles of Sri Lanka
Endemic fauna of Sri Lanka
Reptiles described in 1887
Taxa named by Fritz Müller (doctor)